Tioga River may refer to any of several rivers in the United States:

Tioga River (Michigan)
Tioga River (New Hampshire), a tributary of the Winnipesaukee River
Tioga River (Chemung River), a tributary of the Chemung River in New York and Pennsylvania